"Crazy Love" is a romantic ballad written by Northern Irish singer-songwriter Van Morrison and included on his 1970 album, Moondance. The song was originally released as the B-side to "Come Running" in May 1970 before it was released as a single in the Netherlands, "Come Running" as the B-side. The cover of the single shows Morrison with his then-wife, Janet "Planet" Rigsbee.  The photograph was taken by Elliot Landy, the official photographer of the 1969 Woodstock festival.

Duets with Van Morrison
Ray Charles introduced Van Morrison by starting the first verse before Van's appearance when he was inducted into the Songwriter's Hall of Fame in 2003.  Morrison and Charles then finished with a duet of "Crazy Love". Ray Charles remarked about this performance:  "It meant a lot to sing 'Crazy Love' on stage that evening." Genius Loves Company, Ray Charles' 2004 album, includes this duet featuring the two singers. Van Morrison and Bob Dylan sang a duet of "Crazy Love" on the BBC film,  One Irish Rover in 1991.

Reception
"Crazy Love" was listed as No. 198 on the All Time 885 Greatest Songs compiled in 2004 by WXPN from listener's votes.

Other releases
The duet featuring Ray Charles and Van Morrison as performed at the 2003 SHOF awards is one of the 31 songs on the compilation album The Best of Van Morrison Volume 3 released in 2007.  The original version from Moondance  is one of the hits included on the 2007 compilation album, Still on Top - The Greatest Hits.

Notable cover versions
"Crazy Love" has been performed by many artists. Versions by Brian Kennedy, Aaron Neville and Robbie Robertson were featured in films. 
Helen Reddy had considerable chart success with the song as she scored her first Adult Contemporary Billboard Top 10 hit with her cover version  released in July 1971. The highest charting version of “Crazy Love”  came in 1995 from R&B singer Brian McKnight, whose cover was a Top 10 hit on Billboard’s R&B Chart, and peaked at #45 on the Hot 100.

Personnel
Van Morrison – vocals
John Klingberg – bass guitar
Jeff Labes – piano
Gary Mallaber – drums, vibraphone
John Platania – guitar
Judy Clay – background vocals
Emily Houston – background vocals
Jackie Verdell – background vocals

Michael Bublé version

"Crazy Love" was later covered by Canadian singer Michael Bublé, and released as the fourth single from his fourth studio album, Crazy Love (2009). The single was released on 29 June 2010, accompanied by a number of bonus tracks and mixes from the album.

Background
The single was released on 16 May 2010, accompanied by the bonus tracks "Pennies from Heaven", originally an iTunes Store bonus track on Crazy Love, "Relax Max", featuring Naturally 7, an Amazon exclusive bonus track on Crazy Love, and an instrumental version of "Haven't Met You Yet". The release was accompanied by a music video for the track, again directed by Rich Lee. The video premiered on YouTube on 1 May 2010.

Track listing
 Digital download
 "Crazy Love" – 3:31
 "Pennies from Heaven" – 3:15
 "Relax Max" (featuring Naturally 7) – 3:29
 "Haven't Met You Yet" (Instrumental) – 4:05

 Promotional CD single
 "Crazy Love" (Edit) – 3:08

Charts

Notes

References
DeWitt, Howard A. (1983). Van Morrison: The Mystic's Music, Horizon Books,

External links
 [ Allmusic review: Crazy Love]

1969 songs
1970 singles
Van Morrison songs
Male vocal duets
Helen Reddy songs
Songs written by Van Morrison
Steve Harley songs
Soul ballads
Song recordings produced by Lewis Merenstein
Song recordings produced by Van Morrison
Warner Records singles
143 Records singles
Reprise Records singles